Phua Leng Leng (born 25 June 1970), better known as Pan Lingling, is a Singaporean actress.

Career
Pan entered the entertainment industry in 1988 after graduating from the Singapore Broadcasting Corporation's 8th Drama Artiste Training Course. Her classmates in the training course include award-winning actress Huang Biren, Madeline Chu and Sean Say. She made her TV debut with the series, Mystery, Golden Quest, Ups and Downs. She also starred in Strange Encounters II in the same year.

Pan has acted in numerous television series produced by MediaCorp Channel 8 and its predecessors. She also played a supporting role as a psychologist in Jackie Chan's Crime Story. After some twenty years in the entertainment industry, she won her first accolade at the Star Awards 2011, the Best Supporting Actress award for her role in Breakout.

Pan has gotten 6 out of 10 Top 10 Most Popular Female Artistes from 1994, 1997-1998, 2000, 2018-2019 respectively.

Personal life
Pan married fellow MediaCorp actor Huang Shinan in 1997. They have two sons, Beckham Wee (born 1999) and Kynaston Wee (born 2002).

Pan was diagnosed with Stage 1 breast cancer in March 2013. She kept her illness from the media initially, revealing only that a cyst was removed from her breast. She approached the magazine 8 Days in May that year for an interview on her illness, but withdrew. Her cancer story was revealed only nearly a year later in the 1,222th issue of 8 Days in late March 2014.

Filmography

Television

Film

Discography

Compilation album

Award s and nominations

References

20th-century Singaporean actresses
21st-century Singaporean actresses
Singaporean television actresses
Singaporean film actresses
1970 births
Living people
Singaporean people of Teochew descent